Mulan Joins the Army (simplified Chinese: 木兰从军; traditional Chinese: 木蘭從軍; pinyin: Mùlán cóngjūn), is a 1939 Chinese historical war film. It is one of several film adaptations of the Hua Mulan (花木兰) legend, which have included two silent versions: Hua Mulan Joins the Army (1927) by Tianyi Film Company, and a less successful Mulan Joins the Army (1928) produced by China Sun Motion Picture Company.

The film, described as a musical comedy, was directed by Richard Poh (Bu Wancang) and stars Nancy Chan (credited as Chen Yunshang) as the title character, a young woman who disguises herself as a man in order to take her father's place in the army. The success of the movie was evident by the record-breaking running time of 83 days. The screenplay by Ouyang Yuqian, was produced in Shanghai by the Hwa Cheng Studio, a subsidiary of the Xinhua Film Company.

History of the Tale of Mulan 
The story of Mulan first made its appearance in China as an ancient Chinese folk ballad. The story about Mulan, a warrior maiden who battled while dressed as a male soldier and shone, was retold for hundreds of years. The earliest written account of Mulan was in the Northern and Southern Dynasties, in a narrative poem called "Mulan Ci". It was written in the Northern Wei Dynasties, but also included in the Ancient and Modern Music Records of Chen in the Southern Dynasty. There are specific parts of the story that are present in its many retellings: a young woman takes the place of her elderly father in war, disguises as a man, serves her country, and returns home with honor and glory to resume her life as a woman. Many historians have written about this film because of its controversy, and the producer had to make a deal with Japanese authorities to distribute the film in Japanese occupied areas.

Cast 
 Chen Yunshang as Hua Mulan (花木兰), the film's heroine
 Mei Xi as Liu Yuandu, Mulan's fellow general and eventual love interest.
 Liu Jiqun (s ) as Liu Ying (t )
 Huang Naishuang as Mulan's sister
 Han Langen & Yin Xiucen as two draftees; comic relief.
 He Jianfei (何剑飞) as Mulan's Father
 Wang Di (王蒂) as Mulan's Mother
 Ye Xiaozhu (叶小珠) as Mulan's Brother
 Jiang Xiou (姜修) as the Emperor
 Wang Jiting (王吉亭) as the Barbarian General
 Yan Yan (严岩) as the Hunter
 Tang Jie (汤杰) as the Military Commander
 Hong Jingling (洪警铃) and Ge Furong (葛福荣) as barbarian soldiers
 Fu Weilian (傅威廉) as the Marshal
 Zhang Zhizhi (章志直) as one of the soldier comrades

Plot 
Hua Mulan, the heroine, is a young maiden who lives with her elderly father during the Northern Wei dynasty. Mulan is a mischievous girl who is also skilled in martial arts and archery as her father has raised her. After a day of hunting, she tricks some village people from the Li village into letting her go after setting up a ruse for an impossible archery challenge. Upon returning, she learns that her father has been conscripted for the war effort and decides to go in his stead.

On the day of departure, Mulan is followed by two conscripts who take an interest in her. They question her designation and origin among other things before another conscript intervenes but Mulan puts an end to it with a show of humiliation. She stops at an inn and coincidentally sees the latter conscript who introduces himself as Yuandu Liu.

For the next three years, Mulan and Yuandu work together to protect the border from the barbarian army. Yuandu reports to Mulan of a secret assault but says the commander is in denial after becoming complacent leading him to underestimate the enemy. Mulan and Yuandu manage to get approval of a reconnaissance mission to prove the assault. Yuandu and Mulan split up, having disguised a barbarian hunter and women respectively, to find the location of the army. Mulan is eventually stopped by two barbarian guards who she deceives into disclosing their army numbers. After acquiring further proof by dispatching a barbarian messenger she returns and reports directly to the Marshal her findings. The commander, who has been bribed by the enemy generals, refutes her claims saying it is all a decoy. Frustrated and persistent, Mulan continues to make preparations in secret and on the day of the attack, they manage to strategically reclaim their city as the commander is found guilty of being a traitor and is executed.

Returning to the Imperial capital, Mulan is offered a position in the Emperor's court. She turns the position down, asking only to return to her home. Returning to her feminine persona, she then marries Yuandu. After her heroic achievements and brave service to the State, Mulan finally reveals her life as a woman while Liu symbolically restores the conventional male role.

Production 
Film production in late 1930s Shanghai was a tricky business. With most of the established talent having fled to Hong Kong and the interior after the Japanese invasion in 1937, one of the remaining production companies, the Xinhua Film Company, hoped to relaunch a "Hollywood of the East." The first step was the release of the costume epic, Diao Chan directed by Bu Wancang. The film proved to be an enormous success, a success that Xinhua's chief Zhang Shankun wished to replicate it with a second costume epic.

By 1939, nearly all of Shanghai's big stars such as Jin Yan or Zhao Dan had fled to Chongqing. Zhang attempted to recruit Hu Die in Hong Kong for his studio's newest venture but failed. While in Hong Kong, however, he managed to sign with the playwright Ouyang Yuqian to pen his film, and Cantonese actress Chen Yunshang to star.
Zhang very much focused on making the actress a fresh face for Shanghai, and publicity for Chen began before the studio even saw the script.

Ouyang's script was based on the traditional story of Hua Mulan, a story that most of the Shanghai audience would have already been familiar with. At the same time Ouyang infused the film with subtle nationalist undertones. According to Ouyang, he added plot details based on his research into records from the Ming and Qing dynasty regarding stories of Mulan. Impressed with the script, Zhang and Xinhua invested heavily in both production and publicity of the film. To promote Chen Yunshang, the actress who portrayed Mulan, the studio drew an image of her as a Westernized persona in real life and on-screen.

Reception 
Mulan Joins the Army was made during the Japanese occupation of China and the so-called "Solitary Island" period of Chinese cinema. Given the film's subtle patriotism, it proved extremely popular with domestic audiences. Premiering in Shanghai's newest theater, the Astor in February 1939, in time for the Chinese New Year, Mulan Joins the Army ended up being a critical success. It was moreover, a major commercial success, playing to full theaters in Shanghai and remained on-screen for 85 consecutive days, as well as making its lead, Chen Yunshang, into a bona-fide star.

Mulan Joins the Army  also premiered in Chongqing in 1940, but its release was opposed by the public due to the film's perceived relationship with the ongoing Sino-Japanese war, to the extent that they not only boycotted the screening of the film but also burnt the film itself. On the second day of the incident, the National Government's Central Telegraphic Inspection Committee's spokesperson released a written statement stating that the film did not go against the Committee's regulations and that it did not go against anti-Japanese resistance as was alleged and criticized. There were, however, opposing views to this. Ma Yanxiang, a dramatist, and director had watched a small-scale trial screening of Mulan Joins the Army. He and his mentor tried to publicly call for the cancellation of the screening of the film, but their request was rejected by the local newspaper agency.

Today, the film is seen as an obvious appeal to the Shanghai audience's own wartime sensibilities. The weak Chinese generals and the outside nomad invaders all would have reminded the audience of the country's woes at that time, namely the corrupt warlords within the Nationalist establishment and the outbreak of the Second Sino-Japanese War. As one scholar posits, the film was seen as a call to arms, with the Chinese hero (or in this case, heroine) rising up to defeat foreign attackers striking a particularly resonant chord. The director used various cinematic techniques and angles to implore the public to reflect on the current political situation, drawing the parallel with reality at the time. Real-life political figures, such as Chiang Kai-Shek and Wang Jingwei (Wang Ching-wei), inspired the portrayal of some characters in the movie.

Themes 
Themes of warfare and feminism can be identified throughout the movie. In 1939, the movie premiered in theaters, and China was suffering from the Second Sino-Japanese War. This film significantly glorified warfare and focused on the fame and recognition of soldiers received from serving the nation. The movie is a blend of modern and urban thoughts along with traditional cultural ideas. When China citizens needed the motivation to defend the nation from foreign aggression, the film helped inspire Chinese people to enlist and liberate their country from Japanese occupation. Mulan Joins the Army was rich in "double entendre" dialogue and was one of the primary tools to convey the political message. The author underlines the idea of a citizen's duty, not only to one's family but to the country as a whole, by describing Mulan's life after her heroic acts. During the isolated island period in Shanghai, the release of Mulan was a huge hit. This was because citizens were oppressed and Mulan's acts inspired patriotic thoughts in people's minds.

During the male dominated time period in China, women were supposed to raise children, do housework and rarely involved themselves in politics. Mulan brought on the idea of women challenging  the traditional, social and sexual orders. The ambiguity of modern women brought out different ideas in many aspects like culture, class, generation, and ethnicity. However, these female models shown through big screens inspired women to step up in those areas and begin to show their political potential. When most of the men in China enlisted in the army to defeat the Japanese, women started to step into the workforce to sustain the economy. With the political allegory, the director describes an issue that is mentioned multiple times in the movie: Chinese men are not able to protect their motherland. Also from the 1920s and 1930s, the concept of "New Woman" emerged in the media. The image of "modern Mulans" had sparked off debates over gender, modernity, and the changing relationships in early 20th century China. Bu Wancang also brings up the topic of hetero and homosexuality of the "mischievous tomboy" character despite the conservative views of the public. The theme of New Woman encouraged the aspirations of women to pursue equal education, employment, and political representation as men.

Analysis of Mulan 
The name Hua Mulan consists of the family name Hua (花) which means flower and the name Mulan (木兰). The name Mulan (木兰) consists of the word Mu (木) which means wood and the word Lan (兰) which means orchid. A direct translation of Mulan (木兰) means magnolia. In traditional Chinese literature, Mulan (木兰) is a symbol of purity, delicateness and beauty.

Mulan represents the ideal Confucian principles: a filial and devoted daughter to her father and a chaste female soldier who would rather die  than to expose her identity and disgrace her family. Mulan also represents women's willingness to fight the enemy during war by embodying female strength and power. She is an individual with a strong sense of familial and national duty who maintains integrity while fighting for her place on the battlefield and succeeding against all odds. She represents an eager warrior's triumphs as the embodiment of proper "national" forms.

Among the many ways in which Chinese dramatists sought to galvanize the support of the people to fight against the invading Japanese, perhaps none was more effective and appealing than the cultivation and exaltation of female resistance symbols. In the film, instead of the conventional representation of women, Bu Wancang portrays Mulan as a courageous warrior who is more masculine than any of her comrades as masculinity is defined by courage, loyalty and fearlessness in battle. In a country's time of need, it is only Hua Mulan who does what is right and saves them all. Her behavior throughout the film is seen as exceptional as she stands out and outperforms the rest of the actual men. This was already seen in the opening hunting scene where Mulan strikes a male hunter with her arrow and tells him she mistook him for a rabbit. This scene presented Mulan's masculinity over the other male hunters who have hunted down no animals in contrast to Mulan who has quite a haul as well as the emasculation of the male hunter she struck by comparing him to a rabbit which is slang for a homosexual man. This also demonstrated her superior skills as well as wisdom and brains as she manages to escape their humiliation in the end. Her representation in the film is a symbol of what every man should strive to be as she is their role model. She has proved her potential and ability to accomplish great things with the right motives to the men. This leads to Mulan ultimately not being a role model for women but really a role model for men.

The film also is a thinly veiled allegory for the cause of resistance supported by national pride and patriotism.

Notes

References
 Chen, Sanping. "FROM MULAN TO UNICORN." Journal of Asian History, vol. 39, no. 1, 2005.
 Crawford, T (2020, Sep 02). "UBC professor helps tell mulan's story in classic 1939 cnese film". Calgary Herald.
 Dong, Lan (2010). Mulan's Legend and Legacy in China and the United States. Temple University Press. p. 1.
 Edwards, Louise. "Transformations of the Woman Warrior Hua Mulan: From Defender of the Family To Servant of the State."Nan Nü, vol. 12, no. 175-214, (2010), p. 195. Brill.
 Fitzgerald, Carolyn. "Review of Mulan: Five Versions of a Classic Chinese Legend, with Related Texts ed. and tran. by Wilt Idema and Shiamin Kwa". CHINOPERL Papers, vol. 30, 2011, pp. 267–270.
 Fu, Poshek. Between Shanghai and Hong Kong: The Politics of Chinese Cinemas. Stanford:  Stanford University Press, 2003.
 Hung, Chang-Tai. "Female Symbols of Resistance in Chinese Wartime Spoken Drama." Modern China, vol. 15, no. 2, 1989.
 Hung, Chang-tai. War and Popular Culture: Resistance in Modern China, 1937-1945. Berkeley:  University of California Press, 1994.
  - Ouyang's screenplay is included in the anthology.
 Li, Jing. "Retelling the Story of a Woman Warrior in Hua Mulan: Constructed Chineseness and the Female Voice1." Marvels & Tales, vol. 32, no. 2, 2018.
 Ma, Z (2019, April). "Study of the period of "Isolated Island" in Xinhua Film Company". Master's thesis.
 "Mulan Illustration? Ambiguous Women in Contemporary Chinese Cinema", Images of the Modern Woman in Asia (0 ed.), Routledge, pp. 132–146, 2013-01-11, 
 Mulan Joins the Army (1939) - Mulanbook: The History and Legend of Hua Mulan
 Otto, Elizabeth, Vanessa Rocco. The New Woman International: Representations in Photography and Film from the 1870s through the 1960s. University of Michigan Press and the University of Michigan Library, Ann Arbor, 2011.
 Ouyang, Y (1961). Dianying banlu chujia ji (Memories of a Film Career That Began Midway). Dianying yishu (Film art).
 Poshek, Fu. "Between Shanghai and Hong Kong: The Politics of Chinese Cinemas." (2003).
 Rea, Christopher G. (2021). Chinese Film Classics, 1922–1949. Columbia University Press.
 Tan, Ye; Yun, Zhu (2 August 2004). gle.com/books?id=pmqGAgAAQBAJ&pg=PA86 Historical Dictionary of Chinese Cinema. p. 203. .
 The Legend of Mulan During Post-Imperial China - Mulanbook: The History and Legend of Hua Mulan
 Wang, Lei; Han, Bing; Xu, Guofei (2020-10-01). "Cultural Differences in Mulan between Chinese Version and Disney Version". Theory and Practice in Language Studies. 10 (10): 1332. . .
 Zhang, Yingjin (2004). AAQBAJ&pg=PA86 Chinese National Cinema. Routledge. p. 86. .
 "艺术与政治：电影《⽊兰从军》在渝被焚事件 - 中国知⽹". kns.cnki.net. .

Further reading 

 Arne Westad, O. (2012). Restless Empire: China and the World Since 1750. Basic Books.
 Iwasaki, C. (2021). Rethinking the Modern Chinese Canon: Refractions across the Pacific. MCLC Resource Center. 
 Mark, J. (2020). Mulan: The Legend Through History. World History Encyclopedia. 
 Xiao, Z., & Zhang, Y. (2002). Encyclopedia of Chinese Film. Routledge.

External links
 
 Mulan Joins the Army at the UCSD Chinese Cinema Learning Center
 Mulan Joins the Army on YouTube with English subtitles
 Mulan Joins the Army in the Mulanbook
 Mulan: The Legend Through History in the World History Encyclopedia

Films about Hua Mulan
1939 films
Chinese war films
Chinese historical films
1930s Mandarin-language films
Chinese black-and-white films
Films directed by Bu Wancang
Films set in the Northern and Southern dynasties
Cross-dressing in film
1930s war films
1930s historical films